Sequoia is an orchestral composition by the American composer Joan Tower.  The work was commissioned by the American Composers Orchestra with support from the Jerome Foundation.  It was first performed on May 18, 1981, in Alice Tully Hall by the American Composers Orchestra under the conductor Dennis Russell Davies.  The piece is dedicated to the concertmistress and first horn player of the orchestra, Jean and Paul Ingraham, respectively.  Sequoia was Tower's first major orchestral composition and remains one of the composer's most performed works.

Composition
Sequoia has a duration of roughly 16 minutes and is composed in three continuous movements.  The music is abstractly inspired by the genus of redwood coniferous trees called sequoias of the Northern California coastal forests.  Tower described her influences in the score program notes, writing:

Instrumentation
The work is scored for an orchestra comprising two flutes (both doubling piccolo), two oboes, two clarinets, two bassoons, four horns, two trumpets, two trombones, bass trombone, tuba, five percussionists, piano (doubling celesta), and strings.

Reception
Peter G. Davis of New York gave Sequoia modest praise, writing:

References

Compositions by Joan Tower
1981 compositions
Compositions for symphony orchestra
Music commissioned by the American Composers Orchestra